The 1999 Dubai Sevens was an international rugby sevens tournament that took place at the Dubai Exiles Rugby Ground between 2–3 December 1999. It was the 12th edition of the Dubai Sevens with it being inaugural event for the IRB Sevens World Series. Sixteen teams competed in the tournament and were divided into four groups of four teams with the top two qualifying through to the cup quarter-finals.

After winning their group, New Zealand defeated Fiji in the cup final by a score of 38–14. In the minor placings, Australia won the plate final over France while Scotland won the bowl final over Zimbabwe.

Teams
Sixteen national teams played in the tournament:

Pool stage
The pool stage was played on the first day of the tournament. The 16 teams were separated into four groups of four teams and teams in the same pool played each other once. The top two teams in each pool advanced to the Cup quarterfinals to compete for the 1999 Dubai Sevens title.

Pool A

Source: World Rugby

Source: World Rugby

Pool B

Source: World Rugby

Source: World Rugby

Pool C

Source: World Rugby

Source: World Rugby

Pool D

Source: World Rugby

Source: World Rugby

Finals

Bowl

Source: World Rugby

Plate

Source: World Rugby

Cup

Source: World Rugby

Tournament placings

Source: Rugby7.com

References

1999
1999–2000 IRB Sevens World Series
1999 in Emirati sport
1999 in Asian rugby union